The men's 81 kilograms (Half middleweight) competition at the 2014 Asian Games in Incheon was held on 21 September at the Dowon Gymnasium.

Schedule
All times are Korea Standard Time (UTC+09:00)

Results

Main bracket

Final

Top half

Bottom half

Repechage

References

External links
Official website

M81
Judo at the Asian Games Men's Half Middleweight